Kirtland Community College is a public community college in Grayling, Michigan.

History

Kirtland was founded in 1966 under the provisions of Michigan's Public Act 188 of 1955, it is the state's largest community college district geographically, totaling 2,500 square miles (6,500 km2) and consisting of all or part of nine counties. Approximately 65,000 people reside within the district. Kirtland opened the doors of its five portable classrooms in 1968 with 160 students. The college is named after the Kirtland's warbler.

Kirtland’s new central campus was built in 2016. In addition, Kirtland maintains classrooms and community spaces at two regional locations in Gaylord and Roscommon, Michigan.

Academics
Kirtland offers degree and certificate programs, including transfer associate degrees, and areas of study in arts and sciences, business, professional programs, industrial trades, health science, public safety and more. Evening and online courses are available.

The college is accredited by the Higher Learning Commission. The college also holds membership in the Michigan Community College Association and the American Association of Community Colleges. The North Central Association of Colleges and Schools, the predecessor to the Higher Learning Commission, granted Kirtland Community College status as a candidate for accreditation in 1972 and the college has been accredited as an associate degree-granting institution since 1975.

Athletics

The college competes in intercollegiate athletics as a member of the Eastern Conference of the Michigan College Athletic Association. The Kirtland Firebirds compete in men's and women's golf and cross-country running. Kirtland has half- to full-ride scholarships available. In 2015, Kirtland added bowling to their athletics department. In 2022, Kirtland added men's and women's basketball to their athletics department.

Notes

External links
 

Two-year colleges in the United States
Community colleges in Michigan
Education in Crawford County, Michigan
Educational institutions established in 1966
Buildings and structures in Crawford County, Michigan
1966 establishments in Michigan
NJCAA athletics